Come Rack! Come Rope! is a historical novel by the English priest and writer Robert Hugh Benson (1871–1914), a convert to Catholicism from Anglicanism. Set in Derbyshire at the time of the Elizabethan persecution of Catholics, when being or harbouring a priest was considered treason and was punishable with death, it tells the story of two young lovers who give up their chance of happiness together, choosing instead to face imprisonment and martyrdom, so that God's will may be done.

Background
The book was written nearly nine years after Benson's reception into the Catholic Church. The inspiration for the story comes from Dom Bede Camm's account of the recusant Fitzherbert family in Forgotten Shrines (1910), and from Benson's own visit in 1911 to Padley, home of the Fitzherberts, and scene of part of the novel, to preach at the annual pilgrimage there. The title of the book is taken from a letter of Saint Edmund Campion in which, after torture, he assured Catholics that he had revealed "no things of secret, nor would he, come rack, come rope." Most of the characters in the book are historical people; only the hero and heroine, their parents, and some minor characters are fictional.

It is perhaps the best known of Benson's novels, and has been reprinted several times. It was first published by Burns & Oates and Hutchinson in 1912 in the United Kingdom; an American edition was published the same year by Kenedy and Dodd, Mead and Company.  A new edition, abridged by Philip Caraman, was published in 1956, while an abridged version by Christopher Busby, was published in 1959.

Plot summary

Part I
Robin Audrey and Marjorie Manners, both aged seventeen, are secretly engaged. They both come from recusant Catholic families in Derbyshire, but she is the more devout of the two. Robin's mother died when he was about seven, and his father has continued to practise the Catholic faith, despite having to pay heavy fines for refusing to attend services in the established Church of England. The two families meet several times a year, when Mass is being secretly offered by a priest.

The story begins when Robin visits his fiancée and tells her that his father has announced that he can no longer tolerate the persecution and fines, that he will take the bread and wine in the Anglican church at Easter, and that Robin must do the same. Marjorie advises her lover to leave the area for Easter, so that his father will have time to accept that his son will not follow him. She gives him a rosary which belonged to the recently executed priest Cuthbert Mayne, kisses him for the first time, and urges him to trust in God.

When he arrives home, Robin finds his friend Anthony Babington waiting for him. Anthony is also a Catholic, fanatically devoted to the imprisoned, Catholic Queen of Scots. Robin tells Anthony of his troubles. Later, the two men are out riding, and pass three other men. One of them, Mr. Garlick, recognises Anthony, having heard Mass in his house, and on being assured that Robin is also a Catholic, introduces the newly ordained Mr. Simpson and his travelling companion Mr. Ludlam to the two friends, telling them that Mr. Simpson will say Mass the following Sunday. Robin realises, as he goes home, that he must not mention this to his father.

Robin's troubles at home increase, as he has to cope with his father's anger and sneers. Meanwhile, Marjorie is tormented by unexpected but persistent ideas that perhaps God is calling Robin to the priesthood. She feels that if a love higher than hers is calling, she must not stand in the way, but is unsure whether such thoughts come from God or from her own imagination. She talks to Mr. Simpson, but he is unable to advise her. She is afraid to mention it to Robin, in case she has merely imagined this to be God's will, yet feels she should at least sow a seed in his mind. She prays for guidance, thinking that "a broken heart and God's will done would be better than that God's will should be avoided and her own satisfied."

On Easter Sunday, after the two lovers have met secretly for Mass with other Catholics at Padley, home to the FitzHerbert family, Marjorie tells Robin her thoughts, promising that she will marry him if he wishes, but saying that if it is God's will that Robin should be a priest, she will not hold him for a day. Horrified, Robin accuses Marjorie of wanting to be rid of him. On seeing how hurt she is, he kisses her and begs her forgiveness, but tells her that he cannot make that sacrifice.

Later that day, Mr. Simpson, looking pale and speaking with a trembling voice, reads out to the group of Catholics a letter he has received, telling of the execution of a priest Mr. Nelson, and of a layman Mr. Sherwood, and how bravely they both faced martyrdom. Both were hanged, drawn and quartered for their faith; Mr. Sherwood had also been racked several times. The host, Mr. FitzHerbert, announces that the letter is from Mr. Ludlam, who has decided to go to Douai and study for the priesthood. There have also been rumours that Mr. Garlick will go too.

The following week, Robin returns home, full of doubts and fears, and worried about his financial situation, as he has no money of his own, and his father has made it clear that he will not pay fines for Robin's refusal to attend church. On his way home, he meets Anthony, who hints at some enterprise to restore the Catholic Faith to England, and urges Robin to join him and his friends. Robin's doubts increase: unsure of what Anthony's secret enterprise involves, hopeful that it may offer him a way out of his dilemma and enable him to marry Marjorie, yet unclear as to the morality of the enterprise, he tells Anthony he cannot decide immediately. When he goes back into the house, he faces his father, who angrily demands to know his intentions. Robin begs his father not to pressurise him, but to give him time; and his father gives him until Pentecost.

That night, after several failed attempts to sleep, Robin hears the noise of horses, is seized with curiosity, and goes out to see who is riding at that hour. Hiding behind a wall, he sees Mr. Simpson setting out on one of his perilous journeys with two other men. The sight of the priest risking his life to serve God and bring consolation to souls inspires Robin to make the decision against which he has been fighting. He goes to his father's room, wakes the old man, and says he is ready to give his answer: "It is that I must go to Rheims and be a priest."

A few days later, Robin comes to Marjorie, to say goodbye before setting out for Rheims. They agree that he must always remember that he is to be a priest, and that if he comes to her house, it must just be as to any Catholic neighbour.

Part II

More than two years have passed. Robin is studying for the priesthood at Rheims, and Marjorie is living with her mother, her father having died. Marjorie's home is sometimes used to harbour priests. Anthony Babington visits her and tells her of some business he is involved with in London. He has to go there to meet a priest called Ballard, but there will be many priests travelling together. He urges Marjorie to come to London with him and his sister Alice to meet these priests, so that she may be in a better position to recognise and assist them if every they come to Derbyshire. He mentions also that Robin will be coming. Although Robin will not be a priest for another five years, such students are sometimes sent back to England temporarily as servants, to learn how to avoid the Queen's men. Some of Anthony's business he does not mention to Marjorie. He has become increasingly impatient with the thought of using prayer alone to combat the persecution of Catholics, and is involved in some conspiracy with Ballard and others; but most of his friends whom he has attempted to influence have drawn back and a priest has even told him he is on dangerous ground. Marjorie agrees to come.

In London, Marjorie meets Father Campion, one of the most hunted priests in the kingdom, famous for his preaching, who had entered England in the guise of a jewel merchant. Campion explains his position of mixing boldly with the crowd to avoid suspicion, rather than hiding behind locked doors. He arranges to go with the others to see the sights of London the next day, and they see the Tower of London, and the notorious priest-hunter and torturer Richard Topcliffe. They also catch a glimpse of Queen Elizabeth, of whom Campion speaks with gentleness and loyalty. Marjorie overhears some disagreement between Campion and Ballard, which seems to be on political matters. Finally, Campion discusses the content of his forthcoming pamphlet, "Decem Rationes" ("Ten Reasons"), which expostulated about the validity of the Anglican Church.

When Robin arrives, Marjorie is careful to address him as "Mr. Audrey". She asks him for prayers and advice, saying that she thinks of him as a priest already, and that although her duty is clearly to remain with her mother at present, she has wondered if she should leave the country to serve God as a nun, in the event of her mother's death. Robin promises to pray for her, but reminds her that he is not yet a priest, and gives her no advice.

A year later, Marjorie is in her home with her sick mother, thinking of Father Campion and of the numerous escapes that he is reported to have had. Anthony Babington arrives, and furiously tells Marjorie that Campion, Sherwine and Brian were hanged, drawn and quartered at Tyburn three days previously, that they had been racked continuously, and that they all died praying for the Queen.

The next day, Marjorie realises that her mother is dying, and sends some men to find a priest. In the evening, her mother's condition worsens. Marjorie tells her mother that there is no priest, says that God will accept her sorrow, and urges her to make an Act of Contrition. Her mother cries out for a priest, and Marjorie reminds her that priests are forbidden in the kingdom. She says that three priests have just been executed for being priests, and tells her mother to say, "Edmund Campion, pray for me." Marjorie has a sudden, strong sensation that Campion is in the room; her mother smiles, looks around with no fear, and dies. Mr. Simpson arrives two hours later. Marjorie, calm and controlled, tells him that it is all over. She tells him of the martyrdom of Father Campion and his two companions. Mr. Simpson is seized with a fear that shames and disgusts him, but is unable to overcome it. Marjorie tells him that she will invite Alice Babington to come and live with her, and hints that she will now be able to do more to assist fugitive priests.

The following summer, Marjorie meets a young Catholic carpenter called Hugh Owen. He is building a special hiding place for priests at Padley, and comes to Marjorie's house to do the same. He tells her of how much he was inspired by Campion, and that he thinks he will die for his faith some day.

Some time later, Marjorie falls from a horse near Robin's old home, twisting her foot. Robin's father takes her into the house, and insists that she must dine there. In a private conversation, he asks when Robin will be ordained, and she tells him that if Robin has not told him that, she cannot. He understands, but tells her that he is now a magistrate, and that Robin will have no mercy from him. He warns her that the authorities are aware of some of the movements of Catholics such as the FitzHerberts. When she asks why he is telling her this, he says that he was friend to the FitzHerberts before he was a magistrate. He becomes angry when she mentions Robin, telling the old man that it is not too late, and that his duty to God is higher than his duty as a magistrate.

Part III
Robin is now a priest, and has returned to England, under the name "Mr. Alban". He meets Anthony Babington again; the latter confides to him, as to a priest, the details of the enterprise at which he had only hinted some years before. Anthony and a number of others, including Ballard, intend to kill the Queen and to set the imprisoned Mary, Queen of Scots, on the throne. He tells how they have been helped by Gilbert Gifford, and how they send messages to Queen Mary, in code. Robin begs him to give up the plot, saying that it is against God's law. He is uneasy at the plan for practical reasons, too, saying that too much hangs on Mr. Gifford, who may not be as trustworthy as Anthony thinks. Robin tells Anthony that he cannot give him absolution as long as Anthony intends to kill Queen Elizabeth. He says that as Anthony was speaking to him as a priest, he will regard the conversation as under the seal of confession, but warns Anthony not to come to him the next day as if he knows it as a man, as it would be his duty to inform the authorities.

A few days later, Robin receives a letter from Anthony, saying that he has been betrayed and is being watched at every point, and that Mr. Gifford has been a traitor all along. A letter to Queen Mary is enclosed, and Anthony begs Robin to deliver it to her, or if that proves impossible, to memorise the contents and deliver it orally. Robin destroys the letter. Anthony and his companions are arrested soon after.

Robin makes his way to Chartley Hall, where Queen Mary is held captive. He speaks to her apothecary, a Catholic called Mr. Bourgoign, and tells him that he is a priest, and has a message for the Queen. Suspicious at first, Mr. Bourgoign is finally convinced when Robin offers to confide the message to him and ride away again. He urges Robin to stay and to find some way to have a private interview with the Queen, who longs to make her confession, knowing that she will soon be executed. They decide that Robin, who has some skill as a herbalist, will be presented to Sir Amyas Paulet, the Queen's jailer, as one who may be able to help the Queen's health. Sir Amyas reluctantly allows Robin to see the Queen alone for a few minutes, and Robin hears her confession and gives her Holy Communion. The Queen declares herself to be completely innocent of the plot against Elizabeth.

Some months have passed. Anthony Babington and his companions have been executed. Robin returns to Derbyshire, and is received by Marjorie. He hears confessions and says Mass at her house. Marjorie knows that Mr. Bourgoign is likely to send for Robin again to hear Queen Mary's confession before her execution, and that the message will be sent through her. Knowing that there can hardly be a greater danger for a priest than to risk arrest near the Queen of Scots, she realises that she will face temptation to suppress the message if and when it comes.

The months pass by, and finally the message comes. Marjorie plans to send the messenger away and say nothing to Robin. However, the messenger tells her of the Queen's distress, and she suddenly remembers how her own mother, when dying, cried out for a priest. Though her religion has taught her that God will nonetheless save and forgive without a priest, she thinks of the guilt and heartlessness of one who would keep the priest away from a person near death. She calls Robin, tells him that she nearly destroyed the letter, and prays that God will keep him safe.

Robin goes to Fotheringay, where the Queen is to be executed. Sir Amyas refuses to allow him to see her, but he hopes to be present at the execution, and to be in close enough proximity to give her absolution. When he arrives at the hall of execution, he sees that this will be impossible. He is present as she is beheaded.

A year later, Robin and a group of Catholics gather in Marjorie's parlour to discuss the latest news. Mr. Simpson has been captured and is awaiting trial. To the dismay of Catholics, he is beginning to falter, and there is real fear that he will agree to go to an Anglican service to avoid execution. Marjorie hopes to visit him to encourage him to remain firm, but her friends urge her not to, as her work in harbouring priests is so valuable, and could be compromised if she draws attention on herself.

A month later, Robin is at Padley with Mr. Ludlam and Mr. Garlick, who have also been ordained. They each say Mass, and when the third Mass is over, they hear men coming to surround the house. They hide in the priest holes previously built by Hugh Owen. Mr. Ludlam and Mr. Garlick are discovered and arrested. Robin is in a different priest hole, and is not found. When he feels it is safe to do so, he leaves the house and makes his way to Marjorie's home. She arranges that he will ride away at one in the morning, to a place she has marked on a map. There he will find a shepherd's hut, and will hide there for at least two weeks. Food and drink will be brought to him, and Marjorie will also send him news about the priests who were taken at Padley.

Robin, in his hiding place, receives an unsigned letter from Marjorie, telling him that the authorities had put Mr. Ludlam and Mr. Garlick in gaol with Mr. Simpson, perhaps hoping that Mr. Simpson, having agreed to go to church so that his life might be spared, would convince them to do the same; but that the two other priests had managed to persuade Mr. Simpson to confess himself openly a Catholic again. The three men had been tried, condemned, and executed. At the trial, and at the gallows, Mr. Simpson had shown as much courage as his two companions.

Nearly a week later, Robin becomes aware that he is being watched. He leaves the shepherd's hut, and makes his way back to Marjorie's house. As he tells her how he felt he was being followed, they hear horses. He plans to escape to the hills, but she urges him to hide in the place that Hugh Owen built some years before. He slips into the hiding place, just as the magistrate, old Mr. Audrey arrives with his men. Mr. Audrey is extremely uncomfortable with his commission, especially as he was once friendly with the Manners family. The thought that the priest, if there is a priest hiding there, might be his own son does not occur to him, but he hopes to do as little damage to the house as possible. Marjorie whispers to him urgently that he must leave at once, but faints before she can say more. Embarrassed, Mr. Audrey tries to end the search as soon as possible, and is secretly relieved that nothing has been found. His men, however, mention one more wall they want to test. To his dismay, the men find a young bearded man behind the wall. The old man turns sick and rushes forward, screaming, as he realises that he has just arrested his own son.

Robin is in prison, and it is reported that Lord Shrewsbury has given orders that the prisoner must be dealt with sternly. It is believed that Mr. Alban has a great deal more against him than the mere fact of being a priest. It is thought that he was involved in the Babington plot, and that he had on at least one occasion had access to the Queen of Scots. It is soon reported that Mr. Topcliffe, the torturer, has arrived in Derby on a special mission. Marjorie has the task of reporting this to her former lover, and breaks down, crying under the strain. He gently tells her that God's grace is strong enough, reminds her that it was she who turned him to the priesthood, and says that she had surely known what this meant. He thanks her, tells her he is at peace, and asks her to pray for him.

Robin is severely tortured for three days, spending several hours in the rack-house each day, while being interrogated by Topcliffe. He prays throughout the ordeal, and betrays nothing. He is then tried and is sentenced to be hanged, drawn, and quartered. He is offered his life if he will conform and go to church, but refuses. He has one final interview with Marjorie, in which he urges her not to leave the country to become a nun, but rather to serve God by remaining in England and continuing her work at assisting priests.

A large crowd gathers for the execution, as the exciting story of the young priest, taken by his own father in the house of his former fiancée, draws far more interest than an ordinary hanging. Old Mr. Audrey is believed to be still ill, not having fully recovered from his fit, and there are rumours that Marjorie will be present at the execution. Robin is drawn on a cart to the gallows, and a rope is passed around his neck, causing a moment of terror. He makes a final speech, proclaiming his innocence of treason, and praying for Queen Elizabeth. He then looks down from the ladder and sees a man in bare feet, writhing and embracing the rungs. He looks beyond for some explanation, and sees a girl in a hooded cloak, who raises her eyes to his. Looking down at the man again, he sees a face "distorted with speechless entreaty", and recognises his father. He smiles, leans forward, and speaks the words of absolution:
"''Te absolvo a peccatis tuis in nomine Patris et Filii et Spiritus Sancti . . ."

Period covered
No dates are given in the book, but the story begins in winter shortly after 26 December, St Stephen's Day, on which Robin's father declared his intention to leave the Catholic Church. Later, on the following Easter Day, news is received of the martyrdom of John Nelson (February 1578). Part II begins in autumn, two years after Robin has gone to Rheims, and Marjorie goes to London around Christmas time. The following Christmas, she hears that Father Campion has just been executed. His execution took place on 1 December 1581. The following summer, when Hugh (Nicholas) Owen is working on hiding places at Padley and in Marjorie's house, people talk of the recent executions of Mr. Ford, Mr. Shert, and Mr. Johnson. All three were executed on 28 May 1582.

When Robin arrives back in England as a newly ordained priest, it is just days before the arrest of Anthony Babington, which took place in August 1586. Robin's first visit to Marjorie following his ordination is in November, just two months after the execution of Babington on 20 September 1586. His attempt to see Queen Mary a second time is just around the time of her execution (8 February 1587). Robin hides with Mr. Ludlam and Mr. Garlick at the time of their arrest. They were executed on 24 July 1588. Robin is arrested and executed shortly after. The book ends with Robin's death, but Part II mentions that Marjorie "was a middle-aged woman before the news came to her of [Owen's] death upon the rack." Nicholas Owen (incorrectly called "Hugh Owen" in the book) died on the rack in 1606.

References

External links
Full text of Come Rack! Come Rope! at Project Gutenberg
 

Christian literature
English novels
1912 British novels
Novels by Robert Hugh Benson
Novels set in Tudor England
Novels set in Derbyshire
Catholicism in fiction
Catholic novels
Hutchinson (publisher) books